is a Japanese "rice-bowl dish" consisting of fish, meat, vegetables or other ingredients simmered together and served over rice. Donburi meals are usually served in oversized rice bowls which are also called donburi. If one needs to distinguish, the bowl is called  and the food is called .

The simmering sauce varies according to season, ingredients, region, and taste. A typical sauce might consist of dashi (stock broth) flavored with soy sauce and mirin (rice wine). Proportions vary, but there is normally three to four times as much dashi as soy sauce and mirin. For oyakodon, Tsuji (1980) recommends dashi flavored with light soy sauce, dark soy sauce, and sugar. For gyūdon, Tsuji recommends water flavored with dark soy sauce and mirin.

Donburi can be made from almost any ingredients, including leftovers.

Varieties of donburi
Traditional Japanese donburi include the following:

Gyūdon
 

, is a Japanese dish consisting of a bowl of rice topped with beef and onion simmered in a mildly sweet sauce flavored with dashi (fish and seaweed stock), soy sauce and mirin (sweet rice wine). It also often includes shirataki noodles, and is sometimes topped with a raw egg or a soft poached egg (onsen tamago).

Butadon
Buta means pork.  is a dish made with pork instead of beef in a mildly sweet sauce. Butadon originated in Hokkaido but is now enjoyed all over Japan.

Tendon

 consists of tempura on a bowl of rice.

Tentamadon
 consists of tempura which is simmered with beaten egg and topped on rice.

Unadon

 is a dish originating in Japan. It consists of a donburi type large bowl filled with steamed white rice, and topped with fillets of eel (unagi) grilled in a style known as kabayaki, similar to teriyaki. The fillets are glazed with a sweetened soy-based sauce, called tare and caramelized, preferably over charcoal fire. The fillets are not flayed, and the grayish skin side is placed faced down. Una-don was the first type of donburi rice dish, invented in the late Edo period, during the Bunka era (1804–1818)

Tamagodon
 consists of a scrambled egg mixed with sweet donburi sauce on rice.

Oyakodon

 consists of simmered chicken, egg, and sliced scallion served on top of a large bowl of rice.

Katsudon

 consists of breaded deep-fried pork cutlets (tonkatsu) and onion are simmered and binding by beaten egg, then topped on rice. There are some regional variations in Japan.

Sōsukatsudon
 is similar to Katsudon, but with sliced cabbage and sweet-salty sauce instead of egg.

Konohadon
 is similar to oyakodon, but using thin sliced kamaboko pieces instead of chicken meat. Popular in Kansai area.

Karēdon
 consists of thickened curry-flavored dashi on rice. It was derived from curry udon or curry nanban (a soba dish). Sold at soba/udon restaurants.

Tekkadon

 consists of thinly-sliced raw tuna on rice. Spicy tekkadon is made with what can be a mix of spicy ingredients, a spicy orange sauce, or both (usually incorporates spring onions).

Hokkaidon
 consists of thinly-sliced raw salmon over rice.

Negitorodon
 consists of negitoro, aka diced toro (fatty tuna) and negi (spring onions) on rice.

Ikuradon
 is seasoned ikura (salmon roe) on rice.

Kaisendon

 consists of thinly-sliced sashimi on rice. Fish roe may also be included.

Tenshindon or tenshin-han

 is a Chinese-Japanese specialty, consisting of a crabmeat omelet on rice; this dish is named for the city of Tianjin.

Chūkadon

 consists of a bowl of rice with stir-fried vegetables, onions, mushrooms, and thin slices of meat on top. This dish is similar to chop suey, and is sold at inexpensive Chinese restaurants in Japan.

Gallery

See also

Gaifan - similar Chinese dish
Loco moco - similar Hawaiian dish
Japanese cuisine
List of Japanese dishes

References

Bibliography
 Tsuji, Shizuo (1980). Japanese cooking: A simple art. New York: Kodansha International/USA. .

 
Japanese rice dishes